Cabibbo is a surname. Notable people with the surname include:

Nicola Cabibbo (1935–2010), Italian physicist
 Cabibbo–Kobayashi–Maskawa matrix